Ideratus sagdus is a species of beetle in the family Cerambycidae. It was described by Monné and Martins in 1972.

References

Cerambycinae
Beetles described in 1972